Maria Rosa Cutrufelli (born Messina, 1946) is an Italian writer and journalist.

Biography
Born in Messina and raised between Sicily and Florence, she studied in Bologna and decided to live in Rome. She graduated in literature from the University of Bologna with a thesis on the structure of the novel (mentored by Luciano Anceschi). Roberto Roversi and Italo Calvino gave her advice after reading her thesis. After her university studies, she collaborated with various critical and literary magazines. She founded, and directed for twelve years, Tuttestorie, a magazine centered around "racconti, letture, trame di donne". She edited some story anthologies and wrote radio dramas for RAI; among them, Lontano da casa was published in book form by Rai Libri in 1997. In 1984 in Rome, she thought up and organized the first exhibition of books with female authors and taught "Teoria e pratica della scrittura creativa" at Sapienza University of Rome.

Her books have been translated into about twenty languages.

Cutrufelli is active in the feminist movement and has always been attentive to problems concerning the female condition. In the seventies she wrote various texts on the issue of work, women's emancipation, and a study on the question of pornography and prostitution. She chose women's point of view because it is that of "anche nella propria terra, anche nella propria casa, può sentirsi in esilio, straniera e nemica, sperimentando in questo modo direttamente – e a volte duramente – la necessità del cambiamento, di una frattura culturale, di un dialogo con le altre".

“Even in her own land, in her own house, she can feel exiled, a stranger and enemy, directly experiencing in this way – and sometimes severely – the necessity for change, of a cultural divide, of dialogue with other women".

Aware of the impacts of word choice and language traps, Cutrufelli doesn't love the definition "letteratura femminile" and prefers to speak of writing "firma femminile" to not hide "il sesso dell'autore o dell'autrice dietro una presunta neutralità della scrittura, pur rifiutando di essere catalogata secondo impropri criteri di genere sessuale." / "the sex of the author or of the authoress behind a presumed neutrality of writing, while refusing to be catalogued according to incorrect criteria of sex.”
“‘Letteratura femminile’ è infatti una categoria che raggruppava (e continua a raggruppare) in un'unica ombra, compatta e indistinta, tutte le opere prodotte dalle donne e che ha storicamente assunto una connotazione limitata e limitante, quasi un genere letterario a parte e minore, caratterizzato da un'attenzione pressoché esclusiva ai sentimenti."

“‘Women’s literature’ is surely a category that gathers together (and continues to gather together) in a single shadow, solid and indistinct, all the works produced by women and that has historically taken on a limited and limiting connotation, almost a genre of literature set apart and minored, nearly characterized by an attention reserved for emotions.”

Many of the plots of Cutrufelli’s books were born from her numerous travels and meetings with women from all over the world; from "libri d’esperienza" that re-evoke moments from her biographies (Mama Africa, Giorni d’acqua corrente) to novels that often elaborate further on the stories of women from the past, as in the case of La donna che visse per un sogno. This book explores the last four months of the life of Marie Olympe de Gouges, a feminist during the time of the French Revolution.

With D’amore e d’odio she narrates the twentieth century through the lives of seven women tied to each other through a series of personal events, choosing a structure built on monologues of minor characters that illustrate the protagonists in the various stories. An original interpretation that, like in the case of Olympe de Gouges, unveils what Cutrufelli calls "molestie storiche"; that is, the legacy of misogyny that women who disturb (or even subvert) the traditional order carry behind them. If it is true that, as Cutrufelli writes (citing Zambrano) "le radici devono avere fiducia nei fiori" / "the roots need to have faith in the flowers"; it is a way of rereading the past with the hope that the future brings transformation.

With Il giudice delle donne we return to the beginning of the twentieth century, to Montemarciano, a country in the province of Ancona that looks over the Adriatic Sea. Ten teachers, commanded by the wife of the Socialist mayor, Luisa, welcome Maria Montessori’s appeal to ask for women's suffrage.

Works

Novels
La briganta, Palermo, La luna, 1990. ; Milan, Frassinelli, 2005. .
Complice il dubbio, Milan, Interno giallo, 1992. ; Milano, Frassinelli, 2006.  (the film ‘’Le complici’’ by Emanuela Piovano was based on this novel)
Canto al deserto. Storia di Tina, soldato di mafia, Milan, Longanesi, 1994. .
Il paese dei figli perduti, Milan, Tropea, 1999. .
La donna che visse per un sogno, Milan, Frassinelli, 2004. . [came in fifth for the Strega Prize, Penne prize, Alghero Donna Prize (narrative section), Premio letterario Racalmare Leonardo Sciascia]
D'amore e d'odio, Milan, Frassinelli, 2008. . [won the Tassoni prize]
I bambini della Ginestra, Milan, Frassinelli, 2012. . [won the Ultima Frontiera prize]
Il giudice delle donne, Milan, Frassinelli, 2016.  [won the Lucca-Società dei Lettori prize]

Travel books
Mama Africa. [Storia di donne e di utopie], Milan, Sipiel, 1989. ; Milano, Feltrinelli, 1993. .
Le cinque spine, Milan, La Tartaruga, 1997. .
Giorni d'acqua corrente, Milan, Pratiche, 2002. .
Ricordi d'Africa, San Cesario di Lecce, Manni, 2009. .

Children's books
Terrona, Troina, Città aperta junior, 2004. .

Essays
L'Unità d'Italia. Guerra contadina e nascita del sottosviluppo del Sud, Verona, Bertani, 1974.
L'invenzione della donna. Miti e tecniche di uno sfruttamento, Milano, Mazzotta, 1974.
Disoccupata con onore. Lavoro e condizione della donna, Milan, Mazzotta, 1975.
Donna perché piangi? Imperialismo e condizione femminile nell'Africa nera, Milan, Mazzotta, 1976.
Operaie senza fabbrica. Inchiesta sul lavoro a domicilio, Rome, Editori Riuniti, 1977.
Le donne protagoniste nel movimento cooperativo. La questione femminile in un'organizzazione produttiva democratica, edited by, Milan, Feltrinelli economica, 1978.
Economia e politica dei sentimenti. La "produzione femminile", Rome, Editori Riuniti, 1980.
Il cliente. Inchiesta sulla domanda di prostituzione, Rome, Editori Riuniti, 1981.
La forza delle donne nel movimento cooperativo. Qualità sociale, imprenditorialità, forme organizzative, edited by and with Marta Nicolini, Rome, Editrice cooperativa, 1987.
Scritture, scrittrici. Almanacco, edited by, Milan, Coop-Longanesi, 1988. .
Piccole italiane. Un raggiro durato vent'anni, edited by and with Elena Doni, :it:Elena Gianini Belotti, :it:Laura Lilli, Dacia Maraini, Cristiana di San Marzano, :it:Mirella Serri e :it:Chiara Valentini, Milan, Anabasi, 1994. .
Il denaro in corpo, Milan, Tropea, 1996. .
Il Novecento delle italiane. Una storia ancora da raccontare, with Elena Doni, Paola Gaglianone, Elena Gianini Belotti, Rossella Lama, :it:Lia Levi, Laura Lilli, Dacia Maraini, :it:Carla Ravaioli, Loredana Rotondo, Marina Saba, Cristiana di San Marzano, Mirella Serri, Simona Tagliaventi, Gabriella Turnaturi e Chiara Valentini, Roma, Editori Riuniti, 2001. .
Scrivere con l'inchiostro bianco, Rome, Jacobelli, 2018

Anthologies
Quella febbre sotto le parole, edit. Iacobelli, Rome 2016, 
Il pozzo segreto. Cinquanta scrittrici italiane, presented by and with Rosaria Guacci and :it:Marisa Rusconi, Florence, Giunti, 1993. .
Nella città proibita, edited by, Milan, Tropea, 1997. ; Milan, Net, 2003. .

Short stories
Cutrufelli's stories are present in many magazines and in Italian and foreign anthologies.

Doppie passioni, in La guerra, il cuore e la parola, Siracusa, Ombra editrice, 1991
Madonna Gasparina, in 16 racconti italiani, Brescia, Libreria Rinascita editrice, 1994
Balsamo di tigre, in Horror erotico, Viterbo, Stampa alternativa, 1995. .
Lontano da casa. Radiodramma, Rome, RAI-ERI, 1997. .
Regalo di nozze in Principesse Azzurre. Racconti d'amore e di vita di donne tra donne, Milan, Oscar Mondadori, 2003. .
Northern Hills in After the war. A collection of short fiction by postwar Italian women, New York, Italica Press, 2004.
Silenzi e segreti in Principesse Azzurre 2. Racconti d'amore e di vita di donne tra donne, Milan, Oscar Mondadori, 2004. .
La regina delle nevi in Principesse Azzurre 3. Racconti d'amore e di vita di donne tra donne, Milan, Mondadori, 2005. .
I giardini dietro casa in Eros up! Principesse azzurre in amore, Milan, Mondadori, 2008. .
Io c'ero in Per sempre ragazzo. Racconti e poesie a dieci anni dall'uccisione di Carlo Giuliani, Milan, Tropea, 2011. .
Fuoco a Manhattan, in Lavoro vivo, Rome, edit. Alegre, 2012
La cosacca, in Mappe sulla pelle, Florence, editpress, 2012
Erano i giorni migliori, erano i giorni peggiori, in Scritto nella memoria (edited by Marco Vichi), ed. Guanda 2016

Bibliographic references
Tracce a margine. Scritture a firma femminile nella narrativa storica siciliana contemporanea, Serena Todesco, Pungitopo edit., Patti (Messina), 2017
Riscrivere la Storia con l'occhio di un bambino: soggettività e trauma ne I bambini della Ginestra, Serena Todesco, in S. Magni (ed. by), La Réécriture de l'histoire dans les romans de la postmodernité, Aix-en-Provence: Presses Universitaires de Provence, 2015
La storia al femminile: Maria Rosa Cutrufelli, Maria Chiara Tropea, Università di Catania, Tesi di laurea, 2012–2013
L'invisibile linea del colore nel femminismo italiano, Liliana Ellena, in Genesis, ed.Viella, X/2, 2011
Enciclopedia delle donne, testo on-line a cura di Serena Todesco
Scrittrici siciliane del novecento, Donatella La Monaca, Flaccovio edit., Palermo, 2008
Entre texte et contexte: pour un parcours de la littérature féminin des iles italiennes, Margherita Marras, Université d'Avignon, 2006
Politica, femminilità e meridionalità nella scrittura di Maria Rosa Cutrufelli, Valentina Recchia, Università di Catania, Tesi di laurea, 2006
Travesties of Risorgimento in Maria Rosa Cutrufelli's La Briganta, Cinzia Di Giulio, Dickinson University Press, 2005
Introduzione alla lettura di Maria Rosa Cutrufelli, Donatella La Monaca, in "Lo specchio di carta", 2005.
Scrittrici italiane dell'ultimo Novecento (edited by Neria De Giovanni), Commissione nazionale per le pari opportunità, Roma, 2003
Mobility and Subjectivity in Maria Rosa Cutrufelli's Il paese dei figli perduti, Ita MacCarthy, in Cross-Cultural Travel: Papers from the Royal Irish Academy Symposium on Literature and Travel edited (edited by Jane Conroy), Peter Lang, New York, 2003
A Myth Reclaimed, Angela Jannet, in Italian women and the city, Dickinson University Press, 2003
Sicilian Lives at the Crossroads: Reading Maria Rosa Cutrufelli, Edvige Giunta, in "Academic Forum 10", 2002
Stranger Than Life? Autobiography and Historical Fiction, Carol Lazzaro-Weis, University of Pennsylvania Press, 1999
Maria Rosa Cutrufelli e il suo punto di vista sulla sessualità femminile, Giulia Sanguinat Kranz, in Cultura e società alla fine del secondo millennio, Elte, Budapest, 1999
Il cenacolo degli specchi. Narrativa italiana 1993–1995, Giuseppe Amoruso, Sciascia editore, Caltanissetta, 1997
Nota bio-bibliografica a cura di Edvige Giunta in Feminist writers, Pamela Kester Shelton, St. James Press, 1996
The impossible return: women, violence and exile, in "Voices in Italian Americana 2", 1996
Scrivere una storia, riscrivere la storia, Silvia Contarini, in “Narrativa” nº 10, 1996
History, Fiction and the Female Autobiographical Voice, Carol Lazzaro-Weis in “Romance Languages Annual 7”, 1995
Re-thinking History: Women's Transgression in Maria Rosa Cutrufelli, Monica Rossi, Dickinson University Press, 1993
From Margin to Mainstream, Carol Lazzaro-Weis, University of Pennsylvania Press, 1993
Between Document and Fiction: Maria Rosa Cutrufelli's Voices, Angela Jeannet, Italian Culture, XVI, 1/1998

References

External links
 Maria Rosa Cutrufelli, on enciclopediadelledonne.it, Enciclopedia delle donne.
 Works by Maria Rosa Cutrufelli, on Open Library, Internet Archive.
 Bibliography of Maria Rosa Cutrufelli, on Catalogo Vegetti della letteratura fantastica, on Fantascienza.com.
 Interviews with Maria Rosa Cutrufelli, on RadioRadicale.it, Radio Radicale.

Writers from Messina

1946 births
Living people
Journalists from Sicily
Italian women journalists